Manimal Vinyl is a Los Angeles-based record label founded in 2006 by film/TV producer, composer and former fashion editor Paul Gebser-Beahan.

History 
The label was started out of Beahan's living room in late 2006 in the historical Hancock Park neighborhood in central Hollywood. They released debut albums from Bat for Lashes, Warpaint and many other exclusive releases from avant-garde pop artists ranging from Yoko Ono, Moby, Duran Duran, Carla Bruni, IC3PEAK, Edward Sharpe & the Magnetic Zeros, Devendra Banhart, Asia Argento and more. Manimal has created tribute albums to Madonna, The Cure, David Bowie and Duran Duran with the tributees involvement.

In 2008, 2009 and 2010, Manimal hosted three medium scale music festivals in Joshua Tree, California at the Pappy & Harriet's venue. Line-ups mostly included the labels artists, alumni and friends.

In 2012, Manimal created a distribution, marketing and publicity branch and has non-exclusively partnered on campaigns with The Orchard, Warner Bros. Records and ATP.

The label maintains its focus on a large back catalog of music but has paused on new signings as of 2022. The label also does film distribution and curates live events. Its headquarters are split between Calabasas and Malibu, California.

Discography

Chapin Sisters and Winter Flowers split LP (MANI-001) released as a limited picture disc April 2007
Bat For Lashes, Fur and Gold vinyl LP (MANI-002) Limited Edition with poster June 2007, additional pressings in 2009 and 2013.
Through the Wilderness a tribute to Madonna CD (MANI-003) November 2007 (feat. Lavender Diamond, Ariel Pink's Haunted Graffiti, etc.)
Apollo Heights, White Music For Black People CD (MANI-005) October 2007
Magick Daggers, Black Diamonds CD-EP (MANI-006) October 2007
Hecuba, Sir 12-inch EP/ CD-EP (MANI-008) April 2008
Caroline Weeks, Songs For Edna LP/CD (MANI-004) March 17, 2009 Bat For Lashes solo project
Aquaserge, Tahiti Coco 12-inch EP/ CD-EP (MANI-009) Sept 2nd, 2008
Rainbow Arabia, The Basta CD-EP (MANI-007 Tiny Man/Manimal Vinyl) August 2008
Rio en Medio, Frontier LP (MANI-012) October 4, 2008
Perfect As Cats, a tribute to The Cure 2×CD (MANI-013) October 28, 2008 (feat. Bat for Lashes, The Dandy Warhols, Kaki King, etc.)
Alexandra Hope, Invisible Sunday LP/CD (MANI-010) March 17, 2009
Corridor, s/t LP (MANI-011) May 25, 2009
Hecuba, Paradise CD/LP (MANI-014) May 25, 2009
Rainbow Arabia, Kabukimono 12-inch EP/CD (MANI-016) July 28, 2009
Voices Voices, Origins EP/12" (Remixed and Produced by Prefuse 73) Jan 26th, 2010
Warpaint, Exquisite Corpse EP/12" October 5, 2009
We Are The World, Clay Stones LP/CD April 6, 2010
ASKA, There Are Many of Us 7-inch single (theme from Spike Jonze's film I'm Here) Spring 2010
We Were So Turned On, a tribute to David Bowie LP/CD September 6, 2010 (featuring contributions from Duran Duran, Devendra Banhart, Carla Bruni, Edward Sharpe & the Magnetic Zeros, Vivian Girls, Chairlift, A Place to Bury Strangers and more) All profits go to War Child UK.
Sister Crayon, Bellow LP/CD February 2011
Swahili Blonde, Man Meat LP/CD July 29, 2010, Nicole Turley project
papercranes, Let's Make Babies in the Woods CD/LP January 24, 2011, Rain Phoenix project
Juliette Commagere, The Procession CD/LP September 28, 2010
Sophie Hunger, s/t CD April 2011
ASKA, s/t CD-EP Winter 2010
Duran Duran and Carla Bruni, split 7-inch single (David Bowie covers for War Child charity) December 2010
Warpaint and Sister Crayon, split 7-inch single (David Bowie covers for War Child charity) September 2010
Baron von Luxxury, The Lovely Theresa single Feb 2011
Jenny O., Home EP July 2011
Corridor, Real Late LP August 2011
papercranes, Long Way 7-inch single Summer 2011
Dreamtapes, I Disappear 7-inch single Summer 2011
Extra Classic, Your Light Like White Lightning, Your Light Like A Laserbeam October 2011
The Child, s/t EP December 2011
Baron von Luxxury, The Last Seduction LP Feb. 2012
Cameras, In Your Room LP October 2011
Chains of Love, Strange Grey Days LP March. 2012
papercranes, Three LP boxset Nov. 2012
Heliotropes, The Dove single Summer 2012
The Holiday Crowd, Over The Bluffs LP Feb. 2013
K-X-P, II LP February 2013
Beliefs, Untitled LP March 2013
AACT RRAISER, Holy Wind Delta Dance LP May 2013
Heliotropes, A Constant Sea LP June 2013
Barbarian, City of Women EP August 2013
Spirit Vine, Ascender LP Sept. 2013
Chains of Love, Misery Makers vol. 1 EP October 2013
Shara Gibson, Singapore single December 2013
Shara Gibson, Man Like You single December 2013
Verdigrls, Heartbreak Hour EP Feb. 2014
L.A. WITCH, s/t EP Feb. 2014
IS/IS, s/t Feb. 2014
Chains of Love, Misery Makers vol. 2 EP March 2014
Moby, Rio single (released by Modern Records; curated by MANIMAL) July 2014 (cover of Duran Duran)
Making Patterns Rhyme, a tribute to Duran Duran for the benefit of Amnesty International feat. Warpaint Soko Moby etc. October 2014
Moonwalks, EP1 EP December 2014
Them Things, Astronauts April 2015 (LOOSE)
Cellars, Lovesick LP June 2015
Dear Boy, Hesitation Waltz / The Ghost in You (The Psychedelic Furs cover) 7-inch single (Easy Hell/Manimal Vinyl) August 2015
Moonwalks, Lunar Phases October 2015
Them Things, Mythomania December 2015 (LOOSE)
Yoko Ono, Yes, I'm A Witch Too(collaborative and remix LP with Death Cab for Cutie, Miike Snow, Tune-Yards, Penguin Prison, Peter Bjorn and John, Moby, Portugal. The Man, Sparks and more) February 2016
ATR31 s/t EP June 2016
Noble Oak, Careless single July 2016
Matsu Mixu, Volume One LP August 2016
Eyedress, Where My Girl At? b/w "Sophia Coppola" February 2016
Dakota, Silver Tongue June 30, 2017
BLKKATHY Lemon EP January 2017
Hindu singles April 2018
Dr Fadeaway GLOW March 2018
Leo Nite The Slit EP April 2018
Cellars new EP tba Summer 2019
A Death Story Called Girl soundtrack to the film by Nathalia Bas-Tzion Beahan December 2018 featuring Liberace 
Essere Amato film soundtrack (featuring John Taylor of Duran Duran, David Scott Stone, Lou Rogai and Paul Beahan. 2019
Tara Beier Superbloom LP Aug 2020
Julie Mintz w/ Moby "Purple Rain" single June 2020
Asia Argento w/ Paul Beahan "Widow" Sept 2020
Asia Argento Music From My Bed LP March 2021

See also
 List of record labels

References

Los Angeles Times Top 12 Indie Labels
LAist Article on Manimal Festival 2009
Sarcastic Laist interview with an intern posing as Paul Beahan
Reviews of Manimal Festival 2008
Spin Magazine Review of Madonna Tribute Record

BEAT magazine Label Quest – Interview with Manimal Vinyl
Billboard Magazine MANIMAL LABEL GROUP announced

American record labels
Record labels established in 2006
New Weird America
Psychedelic rock record labels
Companies based in Los Angeles